The 2022 FIBA 3x3 World Cup was held in Antwerp, Belgium from 21 to 26 June 2022.

France captured their first title after defeating Canada in the final.

Participating teams
All FIBA continental zones are represented by at least one team. After the exclusion of Russia due to the 2022 Russian invasion of Ukraine, Israel was named as their replacement. The numbers in brackets show the FIBA World rank.

Players

Preliminary round
The pools were announced on 4 April 2022. The schedule was released on 12 May 2022.

Pool A

Pool B

Pool C

Pool D

Knockout stage

Final ranking

Statistics and awards

Statistical leaders

Awards
The awards were announced on 26 June 2022.

References

External links
Official website

Men
Sports events affected by the 2022 Russian invasion of Ukraine